Boots of Destiny is a 1937 American Western film written and directed by Arthur Rosson. The film stars Ken Maynard, Claudia Dell, Vince Barnett, Ed Cassidy, Martin Garralaga and George Morrell. The film was released on July 16, 1937, by Grand National Films Inc.

Plot

Cast           
Ken Maynard as Ken Crawford
Claudia Dell as Alice Wilson
Vince Barnett as Acey Ducey 
Ed Cassidy as Jack Harmon
Martin Garralaga as Jose Vasco 
George Morrell as Don Pedro Santos
Walter Patterson as Pasquale Ortego
Fred Cordova as Fredico
Sidney D'Albrook as Sheriff

References

External links
 

1937 films
American Western (genre) films
1937 Western (genre) films
Grand National Films films
Films directed by Arthur Rosson
American black-and-white films
1930s English-language films
1930s American films